Maja Kersnik (born April 17, 1981) is a badminton player from Slovenia.

She played at the 2005 World Badminton Championships and reached the second round, which she lost to Mia Audina of the Netherlands. 

In her home country she won five titles at the Slovenian National Badminton Championships.

References
European results
tournamentsoftware.com

Slovenian female badminton players
1981 births
Living people
Place of birth missing (living people)
21st-century Slovenian women